Martin Hughes Nesbitt (born November 29, 1962) is an American businessman and public figure. Nesbit is co-CEO of the Vistria Group, a Chicago-based private equity firm. Nesbitt is on the boards of directors of publicly traded companies CenterPoint Energy, Norfolk Southern Corporation, and American Airlines Group. Nesbitt was the founder and former CEO of The Parking Spot, an airport parking company. He was on the board of the Chicago Housing Authority.

Nesbitt is a close personal friend of former U. S. President Barack Obama and was the campaign treasurer during Obama's 2008 presidential campaign. He also serves as Chairman of the Obama Foundation.

Early life and education
Nesbitt was born and raised in Columbus, Ohio, graduating from Columbus Academy. He went on to earn his bachelor's degree from Albion College in Albion, Michigan, in 1985. After working as a financial analyst at GMAC, he won a fellowship to study at the University of Chicago Graduate School of Business, where he earned an MBA in 1991.

Business career 
From 1996 to 1998, he worked as a vice president of Pritzker Realty group and in 1998, he founded The Parking Spot along with investor Penny Pritzker. The Parking Spot offers airport parking services primarily for business travelers.

In 2013, he co-founded The Vistria Group, a private equity firm, with Chicago businessman Kip Kirkpatrick. Both Nesbitt and Kirkpatrick are on the board of Rush University Medical Center. Along with a series of other funds, The Vistria Group acquired Apollo Education Group, one of the world's largest private education providers, in 2017, and the parent company of University of Phoenix. The firm has over $3.1 billion in assets under management from institutional investors like public retirement plans, corporations, endowments or foundations, high net-worth families, non-U.S. investors and financial institutions. Nesbitt additionally serves on the board of CenterPoint Energy, a natural gas and electric company.

Relationship with Barack Obama 
Nesbitt met Barack and Michelle Obama through Michelle Obama's brother Craig Robinson who was a high school basketball coach. He supported Obama's 2004 U.S. Senate bid and was the treasurer on his 2008 presidential campaign. Nesbitt is currently on the foundation planning board for the home of the future Barack Obama Presidential Library and Museum.

References

1962 births
Albion College alumni
African-American businesspeople
Living people
University of Chicago Booth School of Business alumni
21st-century African-American people
20th-century African-American people